Matasila Freshwater is a New Zealand illustrator, director.
She was awarded a 2020 Springboard Award, and a 2021 Sun & Moon Jury Prize.

Life 
Matasila Freshwater is from the Solomon Islands. She studied anthropology, animation and illustration.

She lives in Wellington. In 2019, she directed the film on the Solomon Islands, Vai. Vai was screened at the 2019 Vancouver International Film Festival, imagineNATIVE Film and Media Arts Festival, and Berlin Film Festival.

Filmography 

 The Orator, 2011
 Shmeat, 2016, animated film 
 Vai, 2019 
 Hiama, 2021 
 Teine Sā, 2021

References 

New Zealand film directors
Living people
Year of birth missing (living people)
New Zealand women film directors